The Maine Nordiques  are a Tier II junior ice hockey team in the North American Hockey League's East Division. The Nordiques play their home games at Androscoggin Bank Colisée in Lewiston, Maine.

History
On February 28, 2019, the North American Hockey League (NAHL) announced that they had approved the membership application submitted by ISS Kings Youth Hockey Club, LLC for a team in Lewiston, Maine, owned by Dr. Darryl Antonacci and that the team would start play in the 2019–20 season as a member of the East Division. The team shares the Androscoggin Bank Colisée and a development program with the Tier III Lewiston/Auburn Nordiques that has a team in the North American 3 Hockey League (NA3HL). The organization is named after the former professional team, the Maine Nordiques. Dr. Antonacci promoted his head coach from the ISS Kings youth team, Nolan Howe, son of Hall of Fame player Mark Howe, as the NAHL team's first head coach.

In March 2020, team owner Antonacci agreed to purchase the Androscoggin Bank Colisée and the Tier III Nordiques from the arena owner Jim Cain. As part of the turnover, Antonacci folded the Tier III junior team and replaced it with Tier 1 youth teams. Both leagues cancelled their 2019–20 seasons due to the COVID-19 pandemic.

Nolan Howe was fired and replaced by associate head coach Matt Pinchevsky 16 games into the 2021–22 season.

Season-by-season records

References

External links
Maine Nordiques website
NAHL website

Ice hockey teams in Maine
Ice hockey clubs established in 2019
North American Hockey League teams
North American Hockey League
2019 establishments in Maine
Sports in Lewiston, Maine